Programa do Ratinho is a Brazilian television program displayed by SBT, presented by Ratinho (Carlos Massa), and first aired from September 8, 1998 with popular content, music, information, interviews, jokes, humor, fun, the main news from Brazil and the world and its people's participation. After its exhibition closed in 2006, and May 5, 2009, the program returned to the program schedule until today.

External links 
 
 

Sistema Brasileiro de Televisão original programming
Brazilian television talk shows
1998 in Brazilian television
2009 in Brazilian television